Double Di Trouble is a 2014 Indian Punjabi-language directed by Smeep Kang, and starring Dharmendra, Gippy Grewal and Minissha Lamba, Kulraj Randhawa as leads, along with Gurpreet Ghuggi, Poonam Dhillon. The music of the film is by Jatinder Shah. The film is loosely based on the 1982 comedy film Angoor which was based on Shakespeare's play The Comedy of Errors and involves a father-son pair who discover their mirror images in a different city.

Plot
The film is based on The Comedy of Errors, where Shakespeare's well known play would take a desi avatar when a father-son pair discovers their mirror images in a different city.

Box office
The film had massive opening collecting 25 million only in India.

Cast
Dharmendra (Double Role) as Ajit and Manjit
Gippy Grewal (Double Role) as Fateh and Ekam
Minissha Lamba as Harleen 
Kulraj Randhawa as Ekam's wife 
Gurpreet Ghuggi as Gunni Mama 
Poonam Dhillon as Pammi  
B.N. Sharma as jeweller
Karamjit Anmol as Jain saab
Neha Dhupia as Special appearance in song Lak Tunu Tunu
Jazzy B as Special appearance
Avtar Gill as Inspector Saab

Soundtrack

References

External links 
 

2014 films
2014 comedy films
Punjabi-language Indian films
2010s Punjabi-language films
Films scored by Jatinder Shah
Films based on The Comedy of Errors
Indian comedy films
Indian films based on plays
Modern adaptations of works by William Shakespeare